The Second Kishi Cabinet is the 57th Cabinet of Japan headed by Nobusuke Kishi from June 12, 1958, to July 19, 1960.

Cabinet

Reshuffled Cabinet 
A Cabinet reshuffle took place on June 18, 1959.

References 

Cabinet of Japan
1958 establishments in Japan
Cabinets established in 1958
Cabinets disestablished in 1960